Donji grad ("Lower Town") is a city district in the eastern part of Osijek, Croatia. It has 11,020 inhabitants distributed in 5,100 households. 

Day of the city district is on 12 September, on feast of Glorious Name of Mary.

Districts of Osijek